Charles Van Mol (born 21 November 1895, date of death unknown) was a Belgian racing cyclist. He rode in the 1920 Tour de France.

References

1895 births
Year of death missing
Belgian male cyclists
Place of birth missing